Woroniecki (feminine: Woroniecka; plural: Woronieccy) is a surname. Notable people with this surname include:

 Jacek Woroniecki (1878–1949), Polish Catholic theologian
 Michael Woroniecki (born 1954) American Christian missionary

See also
 

Polish-language surnames